This is a list of Sri Lankan non-career Permanent Secretaries; they are from different professions. The list includes doctors, engineers, journalists, professional politicians, university lecturers, lawyers, journalists, defence officers, and people in the planning service, education administration service, agriculture service, and accounting service.

Academics 
Dr Ranjit Amerasinghe - Permanent Secretary to the Ministry of Justice
Professor Ranjith Arthenayake - Permanent Secretary to the Ministry of Science and Technology
Dr T. Lalithasiri Gunaruwan - Permanent Secretary to the Ministry of Transport
Charitha Herath - Permanent Secretary to the Ministry of Mass Media and Information
Nimal Bopage - Permanent Secretary to the Ministry of Parliamentary Reforms and Mass Media
Professor Stanley Kalpage - Permanent Secretary to the Ministry of Higher Education
Professor G.B. Keerawella - Permanent Secretary to the Ministry of Ethnic Affairs and National Integration 
Dr Sunil Jayantha Nawaratne - Permanent Secretary to the Ministry of Higher Education, Ministry of Samurdhi, Rural Development, Up-Country Development and Parliamentary Affairs 
Dr Premadasa Udagama - Permanent Secretary to the Ministry of Education  
Dr Wickrema Weerasooria - Permanent Secretary to the Ministry of Plan Implementation
 E L Wijemanna - Permanent Secretary to the Ministry of Education from 1984 to 1989; Educationist; Sri Lanka Education Administrative Service and Director of Education
Professor Dayantha S Wijeyesekera - Permanent Secretary to the Ministry of Skills Development, Vocational and Technical Education 
Professor Rajiva Wijesinha - Permanent Secretary to the Ministry of Disaster Management and Human Rights
Colonal V.S. Kudaligama - Permanent Secretary to the Ministry of Education

Businessmen 
 H.P.C. Herath - Permanent Secretary to the Ministry of Public Relations & Public Affairs 
 Dhammika Perera - Permanent Secretary to the Ministry of Transport

Chartered accountants 
 Gamini Wikramanayake - Permanent Secretary to the Ministry of Public Administration, Local Government and home affairs

Economists 
Dr Deshamanya Gamani Corea - Permanent Secretary to the Ministry of Planning and Economic Affairs
 Leelananda De Silva -  Permanent Secretary to the Ministry of Planning and Economic Affairs 
 Dr P.B. Jayasundara - Permanent Secretary of the Treasury and the Ministry of Finance & Planning
Dr Lal Jayawardena  -  Permanent Secretary to the Ministry of Finance
A. S. Jayawardene - Permanent Secretary to the Ministry of Industries, Scientific Affairs and Finance
Dr Deshamanya Jayantha Kelegama - Permanent Secretary to the Ministry of External and Internal Trade

Engineers 
Dr Nath Amarakoon - Permanent Secretary to the Ministry of Housing and Construction

Lawyers 
Suhada Gamalath - Permanent Secretary to the Ministry of Justice and Law Reforms   
Asoka Gunasekera - Permanent Secretary to the Ministry of Posts and Telecommunication
Nihal Jayawickrama - Permanent Secretary of the Ministry of Justice and Law Reforms 
Dr. Palitha Kohona -  Permanent Secretary to the Ministry of Foreign Affairs
Charitha Ratwatte - Permanent Secretary of the Treasury and the Ministries of Finance, Youth Affairs & Employment
Anura Weeraratne - Permanent Secretary to the Ministry of Industries and Ministry of Fisheries and Aquatic Resources
Mervyn Wijesinha - Permanent Secretary to the Ministry of Justice

Medical doctors 
 Dr Tara De Mel - Permanent Secretary to the Ministry of Education
 Dr Nihal Jayathilaka - Permanent Secretary to Ministry of Local Government, Provincial Councils and  Health
 Dr Athula Kahandaliyanage - Secretary to the Ministry of Health
 Dr T.R.C Ruberu - Permanent Secretary to Ministry of Health and Civil Aviation
 Dr Somadasa Weeratunga - Permanent Secretary to the Ministry of Health (1970 to 1974)
 Dr  Gamini Wijesekera - Permanent Secretary to the Ministry of Highways and Transport

Media personalities and journalists 
 Dr Anandatissa de Alwis - Permanent Secretary to the Ministry of State (1965 to 1970)
 Karunaratna Paranavtana - Permanent Secretary to the Ministry of Media and Information 
 Dr Janadasa Peiris - Permanent Secretary to the Ministry of Media and Information
Anura Siriwardena - Permanent Secretary to the Ministry of Co-operative, Internal Trade, Industries and Commerce

Military officers 
General Deshamanya D. S. Attygalle -  Permanent Secretary to the Ministry of Defence 
General Cyril Ranatunge -  Permanent Secretary to the Ministry of Defence
General Hamilton Wanasinghe - Permanent Secretary to the Ministry of Defence
General Shantha Kottegoda  - Permanent Secretary to the Ministry of Defence
Admiral Wasantha Karannagoda - Permanent Secretary to the  Ministry of Highways
Admiral Jayanath Colombage - Permanent Secretary to the  Ministry of Foreign Affairs
Major General Asoka Jayawardena  - Permanent Secretary to the Ministry of Defence 
Major General Kamal Gunaratne  - Permanent Secretary to the Ministry of Defence 
Major General Nanda Mallawaarachchi - Permanent Secretary to the Ministry of Law and Order
Major General Sanjeewa Munasinghe - Permanent Secretary to the Ministry of Health
Major General Sumedha Perera  - Permanent Secretary to the Ministry of Agriculture
Brigadier Dennis Hapugalle - Permanent Secretary to the Ministry of Internal Security
Colonel C. A. Dharmapala, ED, CLI - Permanent Secretary to the Ministry of Defence 
Colonel V S Kudaligama - Permanent Secretary to the Ministry of Education and Ministry of Sports 
Lieutenant Colonel Gotabhaya Rajapaksa - Permanent Secretary to the Ministry of Defence and Urban Development

Policemen 
Sydney de Zoysa - Permanent Secretary to the Ministry of Internal Security
Cyril Herath - Permanent Secretary to the Ministry of Defence
Jason Selvarajah- Senior Police Officer Norfolk Constabulary

Planters 
Ranjan Wijeratne - Permanent Secretary to the Ministry of Agricultural Development and Research

Uncategorized 
Hemasiri Fernando - Permanent Secretary to Ministry of Defence
Mahinda Illeperuma - Permanent Secretary, Ministry of Transport 
Janadasa Peries - Permanent Secretary to the Ministry of Media and Information

References 

Lists of office-holders in Sri Lanka
Permanent Secretarys
Permanent secretaries of Sri Lanka